A timeline of notable events relating to Kiss, a British commercial radio station operated by Bauer Radio.

1980s
1985
October – The first broadcasts of Kiss as a pirate station take place, initially broadcasting at the weekend across south London but is soon broadcasting across the capital on 94 FM.
1986
Kiss expands its broadcasting hours when it adds a Friday schedule.
Founder Gordon Mac sells shares to ten of the station's DJs, including Tim Westwood, Jonathan More, Norman Jay, Trevor Nelson.
1987
No events.
1988
November – The Department for Trade and Industry announces that a series of new stations in areas which already have an Independent Local Radio station will be licensed. Pirate stations are allowed to apply as long as they cease broadcasting and Kiss mounts a campaign to win one of the licenses.
31 December – Kiss holds its 'coming off air' night at Dingwalls, Camden.
1989
12 July – Kiss is unsuccessful in its initial bid for a London-wide licence, losing out to Jazz FM.
December – A second batch of London-wide incremental licenses are awarded and this time Kiss is successful.

1990s
1990
1 September – Kiss 100 starts broadcasting as a legal, licensed station. Gordon Mac leads a countdown in the studio, and the first official record played is 'Pirates Anthem' by Shabba Ranks and Cocoa Tea. Norman Jay hosts the first full show.
9 September – Kiss holds its launch party at Highbury Fields.
1991
No events.
1992
Emap takes full control of Kiss 100.
1993
October – Norman Jay moves on.
1994
2 March – Kiss launches its jungle music show with DJs on rotation, starting with Fabio & Grooverider.
16 October – Kiss 102 launches in Manchester. Kiss licenses the brand name to licensee Faze FM but the station is fully independent of the London station.
November – Danny Rampling takes his Lovegroove Dance Party to BBC Radio 1.
1995
Another original presenter Dave Pearce leaves for BBC Radio 1.
1996
Trevor Nelson, who had been involved with the station since its time as a pirate, is the latest presenter to join BBC Radio 1.
1997
14 February – Faze FM launches Kiss 105 across Yorkshire. The station shares some of its programming with Kiss 102.
April – Judge Jules becomes the latest DJ to move to BBC Radio 1.
29 September – Faze FM, the owner of Kiss 102 and Kiss 105, is bought by Chrysalis Radio and the stations are rebranded Galaxy 102 and Galaxy 105 respectively.
December – Gordon Mac stands down as Managing Director.
1998
28 March – Kiss' founder Gordon Mac presents his final show for the station.
30 June – Kiss TV launches.
Gilles Peterson leaves to join BBC Radio 1.
18 December – Original presenter Steve Jackson is sacked, resulting in a legal case the following August on grounds of racial discrimination.
1999
 January – Controversial changes are made to the station following Emap's decision to align the station with the rest of its operations. The on-air changes lead to criticisms from presenters and listeners who feel that the station is losing its musical direction. The changes see Bam Bam take over as presenter of the breakfast show.

2000s
2000
September – John Digweed makes his debut on Kiss 100.
2001
Steve Smart joins.
2002
No events.
2003
Graham Gold leaves, having presented a Friday night show for the past decade.
2004
No events.
2005
Logan Sama joins to present a weekly grime show.
21 June – Following Emap's purchase of Scottish Radio Holdings, it acquires dance stations Vibe 101 and Vibe 105-108.
2006
April – Bam Bam is fired shortly before the station is handed a then record fine of £175,000 for a series of breaches which include prank calls being broadcast on his show without the consent of the 'victims.'
Robin Banks replaces Bam Bam as host of the breakfast show.
6 September – 
Due to falling listener figures, Kiss is relaunched with a renewed focus on dance music.
Vibe 101 and Vibe 105–108 are rebranded Kiss 101 and Kiss 105-108. Emap had become owners of the Vibe stations the previous year due to its purchase of Scottish Radio Holdings.
22 October – The Kiss network becomes one of the broadcasters who air a new chart show called the Fresh 40 chart show. It counts down the top 40 r'n'b and dance songs and is broadcast against commercial radio's Hit40uk chart and the BBC Radio 1 Sunday afternoon chart show.
2007
May – Rickie Haywood Williams and Melvin Odoom replace Robin Banks as host of the breakfast show.
2008
 29 January – Bauer completes the purchase of EMAP's radio, television and consumer media businesses, purchasing the assets for £1.14bn.
2009
1 March – The final edition of the Fresh 40 chart is broadcast.

2010s
2010
December – Ofcom approves a request from owners Bauer Radio to drop local programming from the three Kiss stations, creating a national service on the condition that Kiss becomes available on 35 DAB multiplexes on the day local information is dropped, rising to 38 within 3 months of the changes.
2011
January – John Digweed's show, called Transitions since the mid 2000s, is broadcast on Kiss for the final time.
2012
November – David Rodigan leaves, having been with the station since it launched in 1990. He resigns following a decision to move his reggae show to a later slot.
27 December – Kiss 100 launches on the Digital One national DAB multiplex.
2013
7 May – KissFresh launches. It is available on Freeview and online but not on any DAB multiplexes.
12 May – Kisstory launches as a full-time station, again just on Freeview and online.
2014
Logan Sama leaves for BBC 1Xtra.
September – DJ EZ leaves after presenting a UK garage show for the station for the past 14 years.
12 December – Kisstory and KissFresh start broadcasting on DAB for the first time when the appear on the Greater London I DAB multiplex.
2015
January – Kisstory launches on many local multiplexes across the UK.
2016
26 February – Kiss is launched in Norway and Finland.  Content is managed by local teams. In Finland, Kiss is broadcast on FM and in Norway Kiss and Kisstory are broadcast on DAB.
29 February – Kisstory is one of the launch stations on the semi-national Sound Digital multiplex.
1 May – KissFresh takes over some of the local slots vacated by Kisstory when it launched on Sound Digital.
2017
10 July – KissFresh launches nationally on the Digital One multiplex. Its schedule and playlist is refreshed to differentiate it from the main Kiss station. However the station's carriage on this multiplex lasts for less than months when it is replaced on 6 November by Magic Christmas.
2018
January – 
Kiss launches two new online on-demand stations – KISS Jams and KISS Grime.
Some changes to the late night schedules take place on the main station and new specialist shows launch on KissFresh.
26 November – Kiss breakfast presenters Rickie Haywood Williams, Melvin Odoom and Charlie Hedges will leave the station at the end of the year to succeed Charlie Sloth on the evening show on BBC Radio 1.
2019
2 January – Tom Green and Daisy Maskell take over as co-presenters of the breakfast show.
11 February – Kisstory moves from the semi-national SDL multiplex to the more widely available Digital One multiplex.
March – KissFresh is removed from the majority of local multiplexes resulting in DAB carriage for the station all-but coming to an end. The station does retain its carriage on Freeview.
August - Bauer establishes a suite of online-only streaming audio services spun off from its radio brands, including three new Kiss stations - Kiss Dnce, Kiss Garage and Kiss Ibiza. Kiss Dnce would later amend its branding to 'Kiss Dance', whilst Kiss Ibiza would subsequently go off air to make way for an urban music stream, Kiss Jams, later returning  on a separate fourth stream.

2020s 
2020
23 June – Tom Green and Daisy Maskell announce they will be leaving the breakfast show. With Daisy becoming the host of the new KissFresh breakfast show and Tom leaving the station all together. They will be replaced on 3 August by Jordan Banjo and Perri Kiely.
31 October – For the first time, KISS FM, KISSStory and KissFresh unite to broadcast the KISS Haunted House Party.

2021
No events.

2022
27 May – Bauer Media announce plans to launch a subscription service for Absolute Radio and KISS, allowing listeners to access commercial free content for a monthly fee.

2023
 1 March – Bauer announces plans to replace Kiss with Greatest Hits Radio on its FM frequencies in Cambridge, Peterborough and Suffolk, subject to Ofcom approval.

References

Kiss
Kiss